Mohabbathin Kunjabdulla is a 2019 Malayalam film directed by Shanu Samath and produced by Benazir Abdul Nazeer. The lead role of the movie was supposed to do by K T C Abdulla. Due to his sudden demise, Indrans was given the lead role.

Synopsis
Kunjabdulla left everything behind including his hometown and childhood sweetheart and shifted to Mumbai. After a long time, at an age of 65, he feels like visiting his hometown and his girl and decided to go back to his hometown in Kerala. He meets several people during his journey and changes their lives forever. The movie climax shows, why actually Kunjabdulla left the home during his childhood.

Cast

Indrans as Kunjabdullah
Balu Varghese as Mohammed 
Rachana Narayanankutty
Premkumar as Autoriksha Driver 
Anjali Nair as Crying Baby Boy's Mother 
Renji Panicker as Thangal
Lal Jose
Sreejith Ravi
Nandana Varma 
Renny Johnson as Rev Fr. George Idezhath
Parvathi T as Mohammed's Mother 
Ambika
Binu Adimali as Bus Passenger
 Noby Marcose 
Ullas Panthalam
Idavela Babu
Kochu Preman as Grocery Shop Owner
 Jenson Alapatt
Savithri Sreedharan
Sneha Divakar
Anu Joseph

Reception
Times of India gave the movie a rating of 2.5 out of 5.

References

2019 films
2010s Malayalam-language films